= Bazindowal =

- Village
- Country: India
- State: Punjab
- District: Kapurthala
- Tehsil: Phagwara
- Region: Majha

Government
  - Type: Panchayat raj
  - Body: Gram panchayat

Area
  - Total: 72 ha (180 acres)

Population (2011)
  - Total: 477; 243/234 ♂/♀
  - Scheduled Castes: 221; 119/102 ♂/♀
  - Total Households: 105

Languages
  - Official: Punjabi
- Time zone: UTC+5:30 (IST)
- ISO 3166 code: IN-PB
- Website: kapurthala.gov.in

Bazindowal is a village in Phagwara in Kapurthala district of Punjab State, India. It is located 2 kilometres (1.2 mi) from sub district headquarter and 42 kilometres (26 mi) from district headquarter. The village is administrated by Sarpanch an elected representative of the village.

== Demography ==
As of 2011, the village has a total number of 105 houses and the population of 477 of which 243 are males while 234 are females. According to the report published by Census India in 2011, out of the total population of the village 221 people are from Schedule Caste and the village does not have any Schedule Tribe population so far.

== See also ==
- List of villages in India
